The 1981 PGA Tour season was played from January 8 to October 25, with 44 official money events. Bill Rogers won the most tournaments, five, and there were five first-time winners. The tournament results, leaders, and award winners are listed below.

The tour changed its name to the "TPA Tour" in late August, for the "Tournament Players Association". After less than seven months, it reverted to the "PGA Tour" in mid-March 1982.

Schedule
The following table lists official events during the 1981 season.

Unofficial events
The following events were sanctioned by the PGA Tour, but did not carry official money, nor were wins official.

Money leaders
The money list was based on prize money won during the season, calculated in U.S. dollars.

Awards

Notes

References

External links
PGA Tour official site

PGA Tour seasons
PGA Tour